The Light of Western Stars may refer to several films:
 The Light of Western Stars (1918 film), directed by Charles Swickard
 The Light of Western Stars (1925 film), directed by William K. Howard
 The Light of Western Stars (1930 film), directed by Otto Brower and Edwin H. Knopf
 The Light of Western Stars (1940 film), directed by Lesley Selander